Bhoomika Dash is an Indian actress and Classical Odissi dancer who is known for her acting in the Odia film industry. She made her debut through an Odia movie called Rumku Jhumana as a child artist, then as a lead actress in the movie Tu mo love story.

Early life
Bhoomika was born in Bhubaneswar, Odisha to Trupti & Prasanna Kumar Dash. She did her schooling from DAV Public School, Unit-8, Bhubaneswar and currently pursuing her B.D.S. from Institute of Dental Sciences, Bhubaneswar

Career
Bhoomika Dash began her acting career in 2014 with the film Rumku Jhumana as a child artist alongside Harihar Mohapatra for which she received an Odisha State Film Award as the best child artist. Dash made her debut in Ollywood as a lead actress with the film Tu mo love story. In 2015, she appeared in the film Gapa Hele Bi Sata playing the child role of Barsha Priyadarshini. She continued her career in Ollywood along with her studies. She then appeared as the lead actress in the film Hero No. 1 alongside Babushan. In 2019, she appeared as Paro in the film "Nayakara Naa Devdash", a modern take on the legendary movie of the same name

Filmography

Awards and nominations

References

External links 
 

Living people
Indian film actresses
21st-century Indian dancers
Actresses from Bhubaneswar
Actresses in Odia cinema
21st-century Indian child actresses
Ollywood
Year of birth missing (living people)